Zgornje Prapreče is a small settlement near Lukovica pri Domžalah in the eastern part of the Upper Carniola region of Slovenia.

References

External links

Zgornje Prapreče on Geopedia

Populated places in the Municipality of Lukovica